Ridha Umami (born 12 March 2000) is an Indonesian professional footballer who plays as a central midfielder for Liga 2 club PSDS Deli Serdang.

Club career

Persiraja Banda Aceh
He was signed for Persiraja Banda Aceh to play in the Liga 1 in the 2021 season. Ridha made his league debut on 7 January 2022 in a match against PSS Sleman at the Ngurah Rai Stadium, Denpasar.

Career statistics

Club

Notes

References

External links
 Ridha Umami at Soccerway
 Ridha Umami at Liga Indonesia

2000 births
Living people
Indonesian footballers
Persiraja Banda Aceh players
Association football midfielders
People from Pidie Regency
Sportspeople from Aceh